China Life Insurance Company Limited (short China Life) is a Beijing-headquartered China-incorporated company that provides life insurance and annuity products. China Life is ranked No. 94 on Fortune 2015 Global 500 Company list.

See also

People's Insurance Company of China

References

External links
 
China Life Insurance official website
e-chinalife.com

Companies listed on the Hong Kong Stock Exchange
Companies listed on the Shanghai Stock Exchange
Companies in the CSI 100 Index
Companies in the Hang Seng Index
Government-owned companies of China
H shares
Life insurance companies of China
Companies based in Beijing
Chinese companies established in 1949
Financial services companies established in 1949
Chinese brands
Multinational companies headquartered in China